Circaea × taronensis is a hybrid of flowering plants in the evening primrose family Onagraceae. The parents of the hybrid are Circaea alpina subsp. imaicola and Circaea cordata.

References

taronensis
Plant nothospecies